is a Japanese footballer who plays for Ococias Kyoto AC.

Career
After being the captain at Biwako Seikei Sport College, Yu Doan joined Nagano Parceiro.

Club statistics
Updated to 1 January 2020.

References

External links

Profile at J. League
Profile at AC Nagano Parceiro

1995 births
Living people
Association football people from Hyōgo Prefecture
Japanese footballers
J3 League players
AC Nagano Parceiro players
Ococias Kyoto AC players
Association football midfielders